Hemleben is a village and a former municipality in the district Kyffhäuserkreis, in Thuringia, Germany. Since 1 January 2019, it is part of the town An der Schmücke.

References

See also
Attractions around Hemleben

Former municipalities in Thuringia
Kyffhäuserkreis